Moussa Traoré (1936–2020) was the 2nd President of Mali.

Moussa Traoré may also refer to:

Moussa Traoré (footballer, born 1952) (died 2003), association football player from Mali
Moussa Traoré (footballer, born 1971), association football player from Ivory Coast
Moussa Traoré (footballer, born 1990), Ivorian-Burkinabé association football player
Moussa Traoré (footballer, born 1995), Guinean footballer who plays as goalkeeper